The 1988–89 Seton Hall Pirates men's basketball team represented Seton Hall University as members of the Big East Conference during the 1988–89 NCAA men's basketball season. The Pirates were led by seventh year head coach P.J. Carlesimo. They played their home games at Walsh Gymnasium and Meadowlands Arena. Unranked to start the season, Seton Hall finished the season as national runner-up with a 31–7 overall record (11–5 in Big East play). As the No. 3 seed in the West Regional of the NCAA tournament, they defeated Southwest Missouri State, Evansville, Indiana, and UNLV to reach the Final Four. In the national semifinals, the Pirates dispatched Duke 95-78. The magical tournament run ended with an 80-79 overtime loss to Michigan in the National Championship Game.

Roster

Schedule

 
|-
!colspan=9 style=| Regular season

|-
!colspan=9 style=| Big East tournament

|-
!colspan=9 style=| NCAA tournament

Rankings

Player statistics

Deadball rebounds: SHU 83, Opponents 104
Team Rebounds: SHU 150, Opponents 158

Awards and honors
P. J. Carlesimo – Big East Coach of the Year
John Morton – Third-team All-Big East, AP Honorable Mention All-American
Ramón Ramos – First-team All-Big East, AP Honorable Mention All-American

Local Radio

–Some games broadcast on WPAT-FM 93.1 because of broadcast conflict with the New York Knicks of the (NBA) and the New York Rangers of the (NHL).

References

Seton Hall Pirates men's basketball seasons
Seton Hall
NCAA Division I men's basketball tournament Final Four seasons
Seton Hall
Seton Hall
Seton Hall